The  National Student Travel Foundation (Malta) – NSTF  - was founded by public deed in 1977. It was set up by the students of the University of Malta for their international educational formation and 30 years since its founding, it still finds its raison d’etre in the interest it brings to students of all ages.

NSTF Objective & Philosophy

 Objective
The main objective of the Foundation is:
"The direction and development of educational, cultural, and social travel and exchange for students, scholars, and youth at all educational levels in the nation; the expansion and improvement of services; and the promotion of better understanding on an international level"

 Philosophy
"Putting Young People First" is the philosophy that guides the National Student Travel Foundation right from recruitment down to the execution of every educational and cultural project it organizes. It seeks to provide all students with a unique non-formal educational experience with regard to the design and execution of the projects and the training of the volunteers themselves.
NSTF is a non-profit NGO, recognised as such by the Government of Malta, that is directly in touch with a large number of Maltese students through the various educational programmes it organises on a national level each year. These programmes complement the educational efforts of local primary, secondary, post-secondary, and tertiary educational institutions. It is also in contact with many youth NGOs overseas, such as MILSET (Mouvement International pour le Loisir Scientifique et Technique) and its members, the Model European Parliament Foundation, et al., through its participation in various EU-sponsored youth exchange programmes and European/international events. All educational programmes on a national level are held on a non-contributory basis for students.
NSTF executes deeds of a philanthropic nature associated with the restoration and preservation of Malta’s cultural heritage.  It assists students to further their full-time tertiary education overseas through the NSTF Student Travel Bursaries Scheme and awards secondary school students for particular initiatives taken among their companions and in extra-curricular events through the NSTF Prize for Initiative.  
NSTF also provides specific facilities for student and youth mobility through prestigious international affiliations and fosters the mobility and exchange of students at an international level through NSTS-Student and Youth Travel, incorporating personal travel experiences into one’s education process.

History

The popular trend of student travel came about after World War II and quickly spread throughout Europe and the western world. Maltese university students rapidly caught onto this trend. Through the international affiliations of the Student Representatives (SRC), they established their first contacts for what developed into a foremost organisation that operated on a national level in the tertiary sector with strong international links. The Maltese Student Travel Department came into being in 1954, growing into the National Student Travel Service (NSTS), which remained an integral part of the SRC within the statutes of the University of Malta. The change in the national educational system in the late seventies and the dimensions and responsibilities of the operations assumed by the student and travel offices created a difficult situation for the "status quo." The university students, meeting in general assembly in 1976, unanimously resolved to constitute a separate legal and economic entity to be the successor of NSTS, but they opted to maintain its public student character. The National Student Travel Foundation (NSTF) was thus created by public deed signed on 10 June 1977 as a not-for-profit foundation of a public character and formally inherited the defunct NSTS by another deed dated 22 October 1977.

Current State

The NSTF is directly in touch with a large number of Maltese students through the various educational programmes it organises on a national level each year. These programmes complement the educational efforts of local primary, secondary, post-secondary, and tertiary educational institutions. The NSTF Mini European Assembly is a simulation of the Parliamentary Assembly of the Council of Europe, where students represent a European country and discuss topics of European relevance. The Science Projects aim to promote a positive exchange of scientific ideas amongst students at a national and international level by celebrating the positive applications of science in all areas of Maltese society.
NSTF is also in contact with many youth NGOs overseas, such as MILSET (Mouvement International pour le Loisir Scientifique Et Technique) and its members, the Model European Parliament Foundation, et al., through its participation in various European/International events. All educational programmes on a national level are held on a non-contributory basis for students.
NSTF assists students to further their full-time tertiary education overseas through the NSTF Student Travel Bursaries Scheme and awards secondary school students for particular initiatives taken among their companions and in extra-curricular events through the NSTF Prize for Initiative. 
NSTF also provides specific facilities for student and youth mobility through prestigious international affiliations and fosters the mobility and exchange of students at an international level through NSTS-Student and Youth Travel, incorporating personal travel experiences into one's education process.

Philanthropic dimension

NSTF regularly executes deeds of a philanthropic character associated with the restoration and preservation of Malta’s cultural heritage. In this respect, the NSTF was instrumental in the restoration of two Maltese paintings, one associated with Giulio Cassarino (1582–1637), a follower of Caravaggio as is evident in his work, and the other of Carlo Zimech (1696–1766), a priest-painter hailing from Żebbuġ. Both paintings are found in the church dedicated to Our Virgin of Sorrows in Pietà. 
NSTF rendered possible the restoration of another masterpiece, "The Baptism of Christ" by Matteo Pérez d’Aleccio (1547–1616). After carrying out some work in the Sistine Chapel in the Vatican, he was brought to Malta by the Knights and commissioned for the narrative account of the Great Siege in the Hall of the Grand Council in the Grandmasters’ Palace and the Baptism of Christ altarpiece in St. John's Conventual Church, Valletta. His prestigious altarpiece long remained at the centerpiece of the Church until it was moved to the Sacristy in 1704, remaining there till 1996, when it was moved to the Museum of St John's. The painting had suffered enormously and NSTF intervened to sponsor a thorough cleaning and restoration operation in 1999. 
The statue of Christ the Saviour was restored and transferred to its present position at the Archbishop's Seminary at Tal-Virtu with the financial help from NSTF in 1984. 
The Foundation, in 1997, also actively supported the initial studies by experts from the Instituto Centrale per il Restauro of Rome who recommended the restoration works on the silver and gilded bronze reliquary containing the arm of St. John the Baptist. This was the work of Ciro Ferri (1634–1689), an Italian Baroque sculptor and painter who had worked on the extensive fresco decorations of the Quirinal Palace and the frescoed ceilings and other internal decorations in the Pitti Palace in Florence. This reliquary of St. John the Baptist is found at the Museum of the Co-Cathedral of St. John.
NSTF's involvement was crucial for the restoration and preservation of one of the oldest chapels still standing in its original form, the St. Michael, "Is-Sancier" found in the outskirts of Rabat. Architecturally, it is dated round the middle of the fifteenth century, with two reinforcing structures added later. The chapel had been used by farmers as a store for tools and manure, and as a cow shed. Two brothers built a wall to divide the chapel into two sections, each one having a door. In 1981, NSTF provided the funding to remove this rubble wall and restored the church.  
Another philanthropic challenge was the installation of a stained glass window over the main altar of the neo-Gothic Chapel of the Addolorata, at Malta’s principal cemetery, after that an international contest was won by a well known French vitrier Emmanuel Chauche, who depicted the Resurrection from the Dead, calling upon the play of the sun’s rays on glass stained in indigenous colors, white and black.
On the occasion of the 30th anniversary of its founding, NSTF commissioned the restoration of the Mattia Preti masterpiece "The Martyrdom of St. Catherine of Alexandria" which was venerated as the main altar piece at the Church of St. Catherine in Valletta, adjoining the Auberge d’Italie. The firm "Sante Guido Restauro e Conservazione di Opere d’Arte" under the management of Sante Guido and Giuseppe Mantella were responsible for the restoration and provided the expertise for all the educational programmes linked to this restoration project. These included workshops for primary and secondary students, scholarships for art students in Malta and in Rome, and seminars for the general public.

NSTF Projects

 NSTF Mini European Assembly
The Mini European Assembly is an educational simulation exercise, open to teams of students from post secondary and tertiary level institutions, where they discuss various issues related to European Affairs through the political perspective of the European country they represent both at Committee and Plenary Sessions. About 60 students take part during each edition of the Assembly. Another 15 past participants are involved in the running of the project.
Each Plenary session is chaired and addressed by a European personality. Presidents, Vice-presidents and Members of the European Parliament, European Commissioners, Secretary Generals and Presidents of the Council of Europe as well as Presidents and Ministers have addressed this Assembly over the past eighteen years. Past participants guide new participants in their workings each year. Introductory, training and team building sessions are held at the NSTF premises. For each new topic every month, Committee Meetings are also held at the NSTF premises. The Plenary Sessions are held at different venues - including the House of Representatives, the Courts of Justice, the Ministry of Foreign Affairs, the Mediterranean Conference Centre, the Archbishop's Curia amongst others.
Participants are evaluated throughout the year by an adjudication panel and the winners participate in a Prize Tour to the major European Institutions in Brussels & Strasbourg organized by NSTF. The most commendable students are nominated "Ambassadors of the NSTF Mini European Assembly" and are given the opportunity, by the Foundation, to participate in similar even overseas, namely the European Youth Parliament and the Model European Parliament.
Throughout the years, the Assembly has served as an information platform for a considerable number of Maltese students to become well versed in European policies and institutions. It helps them formulate ideas for political measures about current affairs and demonstrates the range and variety of practices of intercultural dialogue. The Assembly is a means to assist the students in acquiring knowledge, skills and attitudes necessary to enable them to deal with a more open and more complex society. It raises awareness to the importance of developing active European citizenship which is open to the world, respectful of cultural diversity and based on common values held in Europe. The Mini European Assembly also highlights the contribution of different cultures and expressions of cultural diversity to the enhancement of the way of life in the participating states. Many of these students go on to attain principal and influential roles within society, both locally and overseas, crediting the NSTF Mini European Assembly for preparing them for their significant work later on in life.

In December 2007, the NSTF Mini European Assembly was awarded second place in the European Economic and Social Committee (EESC) prize for organized Civil Society. This was a great prestige for the Foundation as it meant that its efforts to educate Maltese youth on European issues, equip them with many skills necessary in today's world and instill in them broadminded attitudes has been recognized.

NSTF Science Programmes

 NSTF Malta Student Science Forum
The NSTF Malta Student Science Forum is being organized for the 15th Year during this current academic year. Students aged 16–22 meet at five sessions to discuss a different scientific topic at each session. Students team up to prepare presentations on the various topics. Furthermore, a scientist specialized in the field being discussed is invited to aid discussion. This program is held in collaboration with the Malta Chamber of Scientists. Participants are evaluated throughout the year by an adjudicating panel and the winners participate in the London International Youth Science Forum as well as an International Wildlife Research Week held in Switzerland.

 NSTF Contest for Young Scientists
This is the 14th Year that the NSTF Contest for Young Scientists is being organized for students aged fourteen to twenty one. The National Student Travel Foundation was nominated National Organiser for the EU Contest for Young Scientists by the Ministry of Education in 1997 and through the national contest selects participants for the EU Contest for Young Scientists as well as Expo Science Europe/International. This program is held in collaboration with the Malta Chamber of Scientists.

 NSTF School Contest for Young Scientists
The NSTF School Contest for Young Scientists is now in its 8th year and caters for students aged eleven to fourteen. Students from Secondary Schools team up in groups of three to five persons and work on a science project of their choice. This project is then presented during the NSTF Science Week to other visiting students and the general public. This program is held in collaboration with the Malta Chamber of Scientists and the Malta Council for Science and Technology.

 NSTF Science Art Contest
The United Nations declared 2010 to be the International Year of Biodiversity. It is a celebration of life on earth and of the value of Biological Diversity for our lives. In order to encourage our young children to reflect upon the value of Biodiversity, the four Themes chosen for this year's NSTF Science Art Contest are as follows: Life in Different Habitats (Cities, the Country, Jungles, Oceans and Seas, Deserts, the Polar Regions and Forests amongst others) Habitat Loss/Climate Change/Pollution (the Major Threats to Biodiversity), Facing Extinction and Different Ecosystems.
The best 50 artworks are then exhibited during the NSTF Science Week at Villa Bighi. This program is held in collaboration with the Malta Chamber of Scientists and the Malta Council for Science and Technology.

 NSTF Little Scientists Village
The  NSTF Little Scientists Village caters for primary school children to participate in hands-on science activities as well as create their own scientific interactive experiments. Activities include displays in various scientific forms using a variety of mediums such as theatre, art and music. The NSTF Little Scientists' Village project will be co-ordinated together with the Science Centre Department of Curriculum whereby they can offer their expertise in science teacher training. The target audience of this activity is schoolchildren aged between six and eleven.

 NSTF Science Week
The  NSTF Science Week  is the peak of all Science Programmes offered by NSTF and is held in collaboration with the Malta Chamber of Scientists. The event targets students, youths, young researchers and entrepreneurs from Malta. Students’ projects are exhibited and schools are invited to visit. The exhibition is also open to the public. Foreign theatre companies have been invited over the past two years to put up performances related to Science. It is estimated that around 4,000 school children and youths visit throughout the week.

This prestigious event is also aimed at the corporate sector. Activities specifically designed for integrating education and business include lectures, half-day conferences, seminars, debates and demonstrations amongst others. Science related companies are also invited to participate by putting up educational stands about their products. The aim of these activities is to promote dialogue among the key players in the industry and raise the awareness of the contributions made by both sectors. The target audience for these activities shall be students and the general public as well as professionals, academia, entrepreneurs and scientists depending on the subject matter.

NSTS National Student Travel Service

The National Student Travel Service is an organization dedicated to student and youth educational travel. It was founded under the auspices of the National Student Travel Foundation (NSTF), itself a not-for-profit non-governmental organization (NGO). NSTS found its modest beginnings in 1954 when the Student Representatives Council (SRC) set up the Maltese Student Travel Department, which remained an integral part of the SRC within the statutes of the University of Malta. The dimensions and responsibilities of the operations assumed by the student and travel office lead the university students, meeting in a general assembly in 1976, to unanimously resolve to constitute a separate legal and economic entity. Through its various programmes it provides all students in Malta a unique non-formal educational and cultural experience. Its programs cater for young people from all levels of education. Read More

Accreditation and Membership
MILSET  - International Foundation.

Education in Malta
International education industry